The Oregon Capital Bureau is a joint effort of two family-owned news publishers to improve news coverage of the government of the U.S. state of Oregon.

The bureau was launched in 2014 by the Pamplin Media Group, which owns 25 newspapers in the Portland Metropolitan Area and Central Oregon, and the EO Media Group, which owns 15 newspapers and two magazines  in Eastern and Central Oregon and on the Oregon Coast. 

History

2015, the bureau launched the newsletter Oregon Capital Insider. One of the leading advocates of establishing the bureau was Steve Forrester, president of the EO Media Group, and then publisher of the Daily Astorian.

The Salem Reporter was an original partner in the bureau.  Former Oregonian investigative reporter Les Zaitz directed the bureau from September 2018 to early 2020.

In spring 2020, the Oregon Capital Bureau reorganized, with the Salem Reporter leaving the operation, along with Zaitz. 

The content is now drawn from Pamplin Media Group and EO Media Group, with additional contributions by veteran Salem journalist Dick Hughes.

References

External links
Oregon Capital Insider

Companies based in Oregon
2014 establishments in Oregon
Mass media companies established in 2014
American companies established in 2014
Mass media in Oregon
Publishing companies based in Oregon